Prevala is a village in northwestern Bulgaria, part of Chiprovtsi Municipality, Montana Province.

History

It is believed that Prevala was one of many villages established northwest of Bulgaria due to the persecutions of Bulgarians during the Ottoman Empire.

Population

The current population as of 31.12.2018 is estimated to be 372.

References

Villages in Montana Province
Chiprovtsi Municipality